The gens Auria was a Roman family at Larinum in southern Italy, known chiefly from Cicero's oration, Pro Cluentio.

Praenomina
The Aurii are known to have used the praenomina Marcus, Numerius, Aulus, and Gaius.

Branches and cognomina of the gens
The only cognomen associated with this family is Melinus.

Members of the gens

 Marcus Aurius, taken prisoner at the Battle of Asculum during the Social War, in 89 B.C., and subsequently murdered by Statius Albius Oppianicus.
 Numerius Aurius, predeceased his brother, Marcus.
 Auria, wife of Gaius Albius Oppianicus, murdered, together with her husband, by his brother, Statius.
 Aulus Aurius Melinus, threatened to prosecute Oppianicus, but later proscribed and put to death by him.
 Gaius Aurius A. f., proscribed and put to death by Oppianicus.
 Auria A. f., daughter-in-law of Oppianicus.

See also
 List of Roman gentes

Footnotes

Roman gentes